Annabel Lamb (born 1955) is an English singer-songwriter.

Career
Annabel Lamb has released eight albums to date. She had a British Top 30 hit in 1983 with her cover version of The Doors song, "Riders on the Storm", her only hit in the UK Singles Chart. She appeared performing the song on Top of the Pops later that year. Her debut album, Once Bitten, included a guest appearance by Marillion vocalist, Steve Hogarth on keyboards. Her second album, The Flame, spent one week at Number 84 in the UK Albums Chart in April 1984. She has been diverse at times, her earlier albums showing new wave, synthpop, experimental rock, jazz and ethnic influences.

Lamb has been a session singer and musician for Toni Basil and Tina Charles. As well as her recording and touring career, Lamb has co-written songs with many other artists, notably the song "Amazed Are We" for Maxi Priest. Amongst her influences, she lists James Taylor, Bonnie Raitt, Jane Siberry, Fairport Convention, and Paul Brady.

Lamb has a son, Henry Brill, with her former producer and husband, Wally Brill. She toured throughout Europe since 2008 with Kiki Dee and Carmelo Luggeri as a backing vocalist.

Discography

Albums
 Once Bitten (1983) – including "Red for Danger"
 Once Bitten (1983) – second release, different cover, including "Riders on the Storm"
 The Flame (1984) – reissued on CD in 2010 by Cherry Red, including bonus tracks and B-sides
 When Angels Travel (1986)
 Brides (1987)
 Justice (1988)
 Heartland (1988) – compilation album
 Refugee (1989)
 Flow (1993)

Singles

See also
List of new wave artists and bands
List of former A&M Records artists
List of performers on Top of the Pops

References

External links
Annabel Lamb official website

1958 births
Living people
English new wave musicians
English women singer-songwriters
People from Surrey
Women new wave singers